The AP Poll and Coaches Poll are the two major polls used annually within the highest level of college football to determine the national championship.  Division I FBS football is the only National Collegiate Athletic Association (NCAA) sport for which the NCAA does not sanction a yearly championship event. As such, it is sometimes unofficially referred to as a "mythical national championship".

These polling systems began with the introduction of the AP poll in 1936, followed by the Coaches' Poll in 1950.

Currently, two widely recognized national champion selectors are the Associated Press, which conducts a poll of sportswriters, and the Coaches' Poll, a survey of active members of the American Football Coaches Association.

Until the 1968 NCAA University Division football season, the final AP Poll of the season was released following the end of the regular season, with the exception of the 1965 season.

NCAA Division I and FBS poll seasons (1936–present)
The AP Poll began with the 1936 college football season.   The Coaches Poll began with the 1950 college football season and became the second major polling system.  In 1978, Division I football was split into two distinct divisions and a second poll was added for the new Division I-AA.

NCAA Division I FCS poll seasons (1978–present)
NCAA Division I football was divided into Division I-A and Division I-AA beginning with the inaugural 1978 NCAA Division I-AA football season, initially serving as a voluntary designation and later formalized with specific criteria in 1981. This split allowed independent polling of both divisions in the 1978 season.  In 2006, Division I-AA was renamed as Division I FCS.

See also

 College football national championships in NCAA Division I FBS
 College football national championships in NCAA Division I FCS
 List of college football teams by weekly appearances atop AP Poll

References

Poll Rankings

Poll Rankings